Florin Alexandru Tene (born 10 November 1968) is a retired Romanian footballer and current goalkeeper coach at Neftchi Baku.

Club career
Florin Tene was born on 10 November 1968 in Bucharest, Romania and started to play junior level football at local club, Dinamo under the guidance of coaches Ioan Timar, Iosif Varga and Ilie Balaci, also until his youth period ended in 1987 he was teammate with fellow goalkeepers Bogdan Stelea, Florin Prunea and Răzvan Lucescu. He made his Divizia A debut, playing for The Red Dogs on 18 June 1987 under coach Mircea Lucescu in a 5–4 loss in front of Sportul Studențesc București which would remain his only appearance for the team, afterwards leaving to play for Autobuzul București in Divizia B. After one season spent at Autobuzul, Tene returned back to Divizia A football at Flacăra Moreni where he spent two seasons, earning a 4th place in the first one that granted the team the qualification to the 1989–90 UEFA Cup, a occasion which gave him the opportunity to make his debut in European competitions, appearing in both legs of the 4–1 loss on aggregate in front FC Porto in the first round. In 1990 he went to play for Gloria Bistrița and during the 1991–92 season he was transferred back at Dinamo, being used by coach Florin Halagian in 21 league games until the end of the season as the team won the title. In the following season he played all the four games in the 1992–93 Champions League campaign, helping The Red Dogs eliminate Kuusysi Lahti in the preliminary round, being eliminated by Olympique Marseille in the first round and in the middle of the season he returned to play for Gloria where in the following season he helped the club win the 1993–94 Cupa României by playing five games in the campaign, including keeping a clean sheet in the 1–0 victory against Universitatea Craiova from the final, also in the same season he scored the only goal of his career from a penalty kick in a 5–0 victory against Sportul Studențesc. In 1994, Tene went to play for a third spell at Dinamo, then in the middle of the 1995–96 season he switched teams again, this time going for one year and a half at Rapid București and afterwards he had his only experience outside Romania, playing 10 games in the 1997–98 1.Lig for Karabükspor in Turkey. He returned in Romania at Steaua București with whom in one season he won two trophies by keeping a clean sheet in the 4–0 victory against Rapid in the 1998 Supercupa României and made two appearances in the victorious 1998–99 Cupa României campaign but without being used in the final. He played the first half of the 1999–2000 Divizia A season at Rocar București and the second at Argeș Pitești and in the following season he went for a fourth spell at Dinamo where he made his last five Divizia A appearances, having a total of 275 matches and one goal scored in the competition and a total of 15 games in European competitions.

International career
Florin Tene played 6 friendly games at international level for Romania, making his debut under coach Cornel Dinu on 26 August 1992 in a 2–0 victory against Mexico. He was selected by coach Anghel Iordănescu to be part of Romania's squad at the Euro 1996 final tournament, however he was not used in any games, the same year he played his last international match on 14 August in a 2–0 victory against Israel.

For representing his country at Euro 1996, Tene was decorated by President of Romania Traian Băsescu on 25 March 2008 with the Ordinul "Meritul Sportiv" – (The Medal "The Sportive Merit") class III.

International stats

Managerial career
After he ended his playing career, Florin Tene worked mostly as a goalkeeper coach at various teams, having only two spells as head coach at CS Otopeni and Sportul Studențesc and since 2013 he became a part of Laurențiu Reghecampf's staff at the teams he coached which include Steaua București, Al Hilal, Litex Lovech, Al Wahda or Neftchi Baku.

Honours
Dinamo București
Divizia A: 1991–92
Gloria Bistriţa
Cupa României: 1993–94
Steaua București
Cupa României: 1998–99
Supercupa României: 1998

References

External links
 

1968 births
Living people
Footballers from Bucharest
Romanian footballers
Romanian expatriate footballers
FC Steaua București players
ACF Gloria Bistrița players
UEFA Euro 1996 players
Association football goalkeepers
FC Rapid București players
Romania international footballers
Liga I players
Liga II players
Süper Lig players
FC Dinamo București players
FC Argeș Pitești players
AFC Rocar București players
CSM Flacăra Moreni players
Kardemir Karabükspor footballers
Expatriate footballers in Turkey
Romanian football managers
FC Sportul Studențesc București managers